The Journal of Literacy Research a quarterly peer-reviewed academic journal covering research related to literacy, language, and literacy and language education from preschool through adulthood. It was established in 1969 and is published by SAGE Publications on behalf of the Literacy Research Association. The editor-in-chief is Misty Sailors (University of Texas at San Antonio).

Abstracting and indexing
The journal is abstracted and indexed in Current Contents/Social & Behavioral Sciences, Scopus, and the Social Sciences Citation Index. According to the Journal Citation Reports, the journal has a 2017 impact factor of 1.71.

References

External links

Literacy Research Association

SAGE Publishing academic journals
English-language journals
Quarterly journals
Education journals
Publications established in 1969